Elections to City of Bradford Metropolitan District Council were held on 6 May 1976, with one third of council up for election as well as vacancies in Bolton and Thornton. The election resulted in the Conservatives retaining control with voter turnout at 39.7%.

Election result

|- style="background-color:#F9F9F9"
! style="background-color: " |
| British National
| align="right" | 0
| align="right" | 0
| align="right" | 0
| align="right" | 0
| align="right" | 0.0
| align="right" | 0.1
| align="right" | 125
| align="right" | +0.1%
|-

This result had the following consequences for the total number of seats on the council after the elections:

Ward results

|- style="background-color:#F9F9F9"
! style="background-color: " |
| British National
| R. Shears
| align="right" | 125 
| align="right" | 3.8
| align="right" | +3.8
|-

References

1976 English local elections
1976
1970s in West Yorkshire
May 1976 events in the United Kingdom